Ribat of Kabudan is a historical Ribat related to the Qajar dynasty and is located in Kabudan, Razavi Khorasan Province.

References 

Architecture in Iran
National works of Iran
Tourist attractions in Razavi Khorasan Province